The Von Erich family is an American professional wrestling family. Originally from Texas, their actual surname is Adkisson, but every member who has been in the wrestling business has used the ring name "Von Erich," after the family patriarch, Fritz Von Erich (Jack Adkisson). Jack took on the name as part of his wrestling gimmick (i.e. in-ring persona) as he originally portrayed a villainous (heel in wrestling terminology) German Nazi, hence using a German sounding name.

When Fritz died of cancer in his Denton County home in 1997 at the age of 68, five of his six sons had predeceased him. His firstborn, Jack Jr., was accidentally shocked and drowned in a puddle at the age of 6 in 1959, outside his Niagara Falls home. In 1984, David Von Erich died in a Tokyo hotel from enteritis at the age of 25. Mike, Chris, and Kerry all committed suicide; Mike took an overdose of Placidyl near Lewisville Lake in 1987 at the age of 23, Chris shot himself in the head with a 9mm handgun in 1991 at the age of 21, and Kerry shot himself in the chest in the family yard in 1993 at the age of 33. Kevin Von Erich is the last surviving son.

These deaths are the main basis for a widespread myth about a family curse. The term "Von Erich curse" is also used colloquially to refer to the chain of events. The origin or purpose of the curse is not generally agreed and rarely discussed. More often, the story is presented as a cautionary tale about parental influence, sibling rivalry and various dangers of the professional wrestling business.

Kevin's sons Marshall and Ross began wrestling in 2012, and Kerry's daughter Lacey wrestled from 2007 until her retirement in 2010.

Members

Fritz Von Erich 

Fritz Von Erich was born Jack Barton Adkisson on August 16, 1929, in Jewett, Texas. Originally trained by Stu Hart, Fritz became a top star in many National Wrestling Alliance (NWA) promotions, most notably in St. Louis and in World Class Championship Wrestling (WCCW). He held the AWA World Heavyweight Championship at one time in the 1960s. Despite never winning the NWA World Heavyweight Championship, he maintained his presence within the NWA, holding many other major belts. Fritz also served shortly as NWA President in the 1970s, as well as President of WCCW when it moved to Dallas, Texas. Fritz was also a major part of Japanese wrestling, where he was known as "Tetsu no Tsume" (in English, "The Iron Claw"), and helped rebuild the business after the death of Rikidōzan.

Fritz married Doris on June 23, 1950. Together, they had six sons before divorcing on July 21, 1992. On September 10, 1997, Fritz died of lung cancer that had spread to his brain.

Second generation

Jack Adkisson Jr. 
Fritz Von Erich's first son was born Jack Barton Adkisson, Jr. on September 21, 1952. He died at the age of six in Niagara Falls, New York, on March 7, 1959.

Kevin Von Erich 

Born Kevin Ross Adkisson on May 15, 1957, in Belleville, Illinois, "The Golden Warrior" Kevin Von Erich is the second oldest and last surviving son of Fritz Von Erich.

The majority of Kevin's career was spent working in World Class Championship Wrestling (WCCW), where he had feuds against wrestlers such as Chris Adams, The Fabulous Freebirds, and Ric Flair. It was there that Kevin became known for utilizing trademark maneuvers like the body scissors and the iron claw, as well as for wrestling barefoot.

Kevin has been married since August 1, 1980, to Pamela J. May. Together they have four children, including two daughters: Kristen Rain (born February 3, 1981) and Jillian Lindsey (born February 10, 1985) as well as two sons: David Michael "Ross" (born June 1, 1988) and Kevin Marshall (born November 10, 1992). Kevin is also a grandfather to Adeline Claire (born September 22, 2004) and six others.

In May 2006, Kevin sold the WCCW footage to Vince McMahon and World Wrestling Entertainment (WWE). At WrestleMania XXV, Kevin represented the Von Erich family during their induction into the WWE Hall of Fame. In 2015, Kevin appeared in an ESPN 30 for 30 short film titled "Wrestling the Curse".

David Von Erich 

"The Yellow Rose of Texas" David Von Erich was the third son of Fritz Von Erich. He was born David Alan Adkisson on July 22, 1958, in Dallas, Texas.

David worked in the World Class Championship Wrestling promotion. It was there that he faced off with Harley Race and later Ric Flair several times for the NWA World Heavyweight Championship (never winning), as well as teamed with brothers Kevin and Kerry against The Fabulous Freebirds. David also wrestled in Missouri, winning the Missouri Heavyweight Championship on a couple of occasions. From late 1981 to mid-1982, David wrestled in the Florida territory to show that he could work as a heel. This run was successful, with David enjoying brief reigns as both as singles and tag team champion.

David was married on June 26, 1978, to Candy L. McLeod. Together, they had a daughter Natosha Zoeanna (born October 19, 1978) The baby died in infancy and David's marriage soon ended in divorce on July 12, 1979. He married again on June 8, 1982, to Patricia A. Matter. They remained together until David's death.

David died on February 10, 1984, in Tokyo, Japan. The US Embassy's death report says he died of acute enteritis. Ric Flair wrote in his autobiography, To Be the Man, that "everyone in wrestling believes" that it was a drug overdose that really killed him and that Bruiser Brody (a fellow wrestler who found David) disposed of the narcotics by flushing them down a toilet before the police arrived. Mick Foley also claims that he died from an apparent drug overdose. A tribute show was held a couple of months later in his honor, during which his younger brother, Kerry Von Erich, won the NWA World Title from Ric Flair.

Kerry Von Erich 

Kerry Von Erich was the fourth son of Fritz Von Erich. He was born Kerry Gene Adkisson on February 3, 1960, in Niagara Falls, New York. Known as "The Modern Day Warrior" and "The Texas Tornado", Kerry was by far the best-known of the Von Erich Family.

Much like his brothers, Kerry spent the majority of his career wrestling in World Class Championship Wrestling. Amongst the many major feuds he had were those against Gino Hernandez, Iceman Parsons, Chris Adams and The Fabulous Freebirds. Kerry became the most successful of the Von Erich family when he won the NWA World Heavyweight Title from Ric Flair at the David Von Erich Memorial Parade of Champions, a tribute show to his deceased older brother. Kerry lost the belt three weeks later to Flair. Kerry also wrestled for several months under the ring name "The Texas Tornado" in both the World Wrestling Federation (where he won the WWF Intercontinental Championship at SummerSlam on August 27, 1990) and Global Wrestling Federation.

Kerry was married on June 18, 1983, to Catherine "Cathy" Murray. Together they have two daughters: Hollie Brooke (born September 19, 1984) and Lacey Dawn (born July 17, 1986). The couple later separated, before divorcing on April 22, 1992. Lacey wrestled for several years, most notably with TNA as Lacey Von Erich, before leaving the wrestling business in 2010.

Kerry shot a .44 caliber bullet through his heart on February 18, 1993, on his father's ranch in Denton County, Texas. There is a marker placed by his father Fritz of an angel on the spot Kerry had shot himself. Bret Hart states in his biography, Hitman: My Real Life in the Cartoon World of Wrestling, that Kerry had told him months before about his plans, that he had wanted to follow his late brothers, that they were calling him. His marriage had fallen apart as well and he thought his death was inevitable.

Mike Von Erich 

Mike Von Erich was the fifth son of Fritz Von Erich. He was born Michael Brett Adkisson on March 2, 1964, in Dallas, Texas. Known as the "Inspirational Warrior".

Mike replaced David in the feud the Von Erichs had with The Fabulous Freebirds following David's death. According to the DVD Heroes of World Class, Mike wanted to work for World Class as a cameraman and had no interest in being in the ring full-time. His only previous involvement on-screen was being involved in an angle where Ric Flair insulted him and wrestled him as a run-up, to what was planned, as David winning the NWA World Heavyweight Championship, but Fritz pressured him into the ring after David's death.

Mike was married on February 14, 1985, to Shani Danette Garza. Shortly after his wedding, he injured his shoulder on a tour of Israel and had surgery, leading to toxic shock syndrome.
He tried returning to wrestling after partial recovery, but retired for lack of strength. He took a fatal dose of tranquilizers on April 12, 1987, in Denton County, Texas.

Chris Von Erich 

Born Chris Barton Adkisson on September 30, 1969, in Dallas, Texas, Chris Von Erich was the youngest of the Von Erich family. Due to his short stature (5'4"), asthma, and extremely brittle bones that were prone to breaking, Chris was never able to reach the success his father and brothers reached. He made many attempts to succeed in the squared circle due to an incredible love of wrestling that kept him going despite numerous injuries. He managed one major feud with Percy Pringle in the USWA/World Class, but his career didn't take off like the rest of the family's. On occasion, he and his brothers Kerry and Kevin, and also Chris Adams wrestled tag-team matches against Percy Pringle and Steve Austin, but Chris only wrestled Pringle, while the much more athletic Adams, Kerry or Kevin wrestled Austin.

After several years of not being able to succeed in the wrestling business, Chris became depressed and frustrated. He was also heartbroken over the loss of his brother, Mike. In 1991, aged 21, he shot himself in the head.

Third generation

Ross Von Erich 
 David Michael Ross Adkisson (born June 1, 1988), better known as Ross Von Erich, is the son of Kevin Von Erich. He is named after David and Mike. He was trained by Kevin, Harley Race and the Pro Wrestling Noah dojo. Ross returned to Texas to attend college in 2008, according to the family website, and reportedly has wrestled a couple of times. In a 2010 interview, Ross stated that he and his brother Marshall are also training to become professional wrestlers. They debuted as a tag team for Pro Wrestling Noah on July 22, 2012. Ross and Marshall made their national television debut as part of the Total Nonstop Action Wrestling (TNA) Slammiversary XII PPV on June 15, 2014, in a tag match defeating The BroMans via disqualification. In July 2017 Ross, along with his brother Marshall and father Kevin, wrestled at the Rage Megashow in Israel. In May 2019, Ross and Marshall signed a multi-year contract with Major League Wrestling (MLW).

Marshall Von Erich 

Kevin Marshall Adkisson (born November 10, 1992), better known as Marshall Von Erich, is the son of Kevin Von Erich. He is named after his father. He was trained by Kevin, Harley Race and at the Noah dojo. He debuted in 2012, with his brother Ross in Pro Wrestling Noah. He adapted his father's trademark of wrestling barefoot. Marshall and Ross made their national television debut at Slammiversary XII on June 15, 2014, where they defeated The BroMans. On May 29, 2015, the brothers debuted at Imperial Wrestling Revolution, their new home promotion. They won the IWR Tag Team Championships from the Arrow Club in 2017. In July 2017 Marshall, along with his brother Ross and father Kevin, wrestled at the Rage Megashow in Israel. In May 2019, Marshall and Ross signed a multi-year contract with Major League Wrestling (MLW).

Lacey Von Erich 

Lacey Dawn Adkisson (born July 17, 1986), better known as Lacey Von Erich is the daughter of Kerry Von Erich. She was previously with World Wrestling Entertainment and Total Nonstop Action (TNA) where she was a former TNA Knockouts Tag Team Champion. She retired in 2010.

Fictional relatives

Waldo Von Erich 

Waldo Von Erich was the stage name of Canadian professional wrestler Walter Sieber. Though billed as the brother of Fritz Von Erich when they teamed, he is not related to the Adkisson family. Waldo died in July 2009.

Lance Von Erich 

Lance Von Erich was the stage name of Dallas-born professional wrestler William Kevin "Ricky" Vaughn. He was billed for a brief period of time in the 1980s as the son of Waldo Von Erich, but there was no biological relation between the two. Lance also has no biological relation to the Adkisson family.

Rip Von Erich 
On two episodes of MLW Fusion, Tom Lawlor who was involved in a feud with the Von Erichs after turning his back on them recently, mercilessly beat and then aligned himself with a wrestler he called "Rip Von Erich" who was played by a wrestler who had previously gone under the name Kit Osbourne in other promotions.

WWE Hall of Fame 
On March 16, 2009, it was announced that the Von Erich family would be inducted (as a group) into the WWE Hall of Fame. They were inducted by longtime Von Erich rival Michael "P.S." Hayes, with Kevin Von Erich accepting the induction.

Family tree 

† = deceased

Championships and accomplishments 
As a family
 WWE
 WWE Hall of Fame (Class of 2009) - Fritz, Kerry, Kevin, Mike, David, and Chris

Individual
 Fritz Von Erich
 Championships and accomplishments
 Kevin Von Erich
 Championships and accomplishments
 David Von Erich
 Championships and accomplishments
 Kerry Von Erich
 Championships and accomplishments
 Mike Von Erich
 Championships and accomplishments
 Chris Von Erich
 Championships and accomplishments
 Lacey Von Erich
 Championships and accomplishments
 Marshall and Ross Von Erich
 Championships and accomplishments

Legacy

Portrayal in film
In 2022, it was announced that A24 would be making a film centered around the Von Erich family. Titled The Iron Claw, which is based on the famous wrestling move done by the Von Erich family, the film will be directed by Sean Durkin, and will star Zac Efron, Lily James, Harris Dickinson, and Holt McCallany.

See also
 List of premature professional wrestling deaths

References

External links 

 Kevin Von Erich's WWE Where Are They Now? Profile
 WWE Hall of Fame profile
 The Fall of the House of Von Erich

 
Professional wrestlers from Texas
Professional wrestling families
WWE Hall of Fame inductees
WWE Hall of Fame team inductees
Major League Wrestling teams and stables